Nola atripuncta is a moth in the family Nolidae. It was described by George Hampson in 1909. It is found in Nigeria.

References

Endemic fauna of Nigeria
atripuncta
Moths of Africa
Insects of Uganda
Moths described in 1909